Hareg Sidelil (born 20 April 1981) is an Ethiopian middle-distance runner. She competed in the women's 1500 metres at the 2000 Summer Olympics.

References

External links
 

1981 births
Living people
Athletes (track and field) at the 2000 Summer Olympics
Ethiopian female middle-distance runners
Olympic athletes of Ethiopia
Place of birth missing (living people)
20th-century Ethiopian women
21st-century Ethiopian women